Amyellidae is a family of flatworms belonging to the order Polycladida.

Genera:
 Amyella Bock, 1922 
 Chromyella Correa, 1958

References

Platyhelminthes